The New Caledonia national football team represents the territory of New Caledonia in international association football. It is fielded by Fédération Calédonienne de Football, the governing body of football in New Caledonia, and competes as a member of the Oceania Football Confederation (OFC), which encompasses the countries of Oceania. New Caledonia played their first international match on 19 September 1951 in a 2–0 loss to New Zealand in Nouméa.

New Caledonia have competed in numerous competitions, and all players who have played in at least one international match, either as a member of the starting eleven or as a substitute, are listed below. Each player's details include his playing position while with the team, the number of caps earned and goals scored in all international matches, and details of the first and most recent matches played in. The names are initially ordered by number of caps (in descending order), then by date of debut, then by alphabetical order. All statistics are correct up to and including the match played on 21 September 2022.

Key

Players

References

New Caledonia international footballers
Association football player non-biographical articles